C.A.T. Squad (also titled Stalking Danger) is a 1986 television film starring Joseph Cortese, Jack Youngblood, Steve James, Bradley Whitford, and Barry Corbin. It is directed by William Friedkin and written by Gerald Petievich, who had collaborated on To Live and Die in L.A. the previous year. The original score was composed by Ennio Morricone.

The film follows the titular squad, an elite black ops unit, investigating a terrorist plot to sabotage a NATO defense project. It aired on NBC on July 27, 1986. It was followed by a sequel, C.A.T. Squad: Python Wolf, in 1988.

Plot
After the murder of several scientists around the world who are working on Project Grass Valley, NATO's space-based laser weapon system, a special inter-governmental task force known as the Counter Assault Tactical (C.A.T.) Squad is assigned to protect the remaining scientists and ideally to neutralize the threat, whose origin is unknown.

A team is composed of leader Richard "Doc" Burkholder (Joseph Cortese), a ruthless man with a dancer girlfriend who wants him to marry her so that she does not have to take back her ex-husband to raise their daughter, his second-in-command Bud Raines (Steve James), whose wife fears that he will miss the teenage years of his hearing-impaired son's life, John "Roadmaster" Sommers (Jack Youngblood), an explosives expert who hates urban centers and has to be collected from his hunting grounds in rural Alaska, Nikki Blake (Patricia Charbonneau), a forensics expert, and new recruit Leon Trepper (Bradley Whitford), a young language expert whose graduation is fast-tracked so that he can join the mission.

When one of the protected scientists is killed by a rocket the team requests any recent reports including the terms "rocket" or "rocket launcher" and is informed that a rocket launcher has been stolen from a military base in Nuremberg, Germany. There they interrogate a young soldier who admits that he stole it for a supposed Nicaraguan freedom fighter with a medical background named "Alain" and provides the address of the man's girlfriend in Paris. An agent finds materials for counterfeiting passports along with the suspect's photo in the apartment but is attacked by the hitman while calling in the information to the C.A.T. Squad.

The squad find the remains of a burnt postcard and Blake uncovers a coded message in invisible ink. Using a computer she deciphers the message as "Spivek", the head of Project Grass Valley and likely the next person to be killed. They place Spivek under protection and investigate the address of a man nearby who has been switching license plates. There they subdue a guard and find the tenant, a former Mossad agent now working for the Secret Service who wants to find the killer himself because he believes that the suspect is also responsible for the death of an Israeli diplomat. He allows the team to temporarily head the investigation for a few weeks and provides them with information about an older man who is instructing the hitman.

Nikki obtains information from a prostitute that one of her tricks will be earning a lot of money from a hit to be performed on the university campus, but the prostitute is revealed to be working with the hitman and has provided them false information in order to mislead them. An unannounced and unauthorized gas truck passes by the house where they are hiding Spivek so they search the house with a dog, who senses a gas leak. The team rushes the family outside to safety shortly before the house explodes. For failing to report the gas truck, Trepper is demoted from house watchman to permanent limo driver. Three assassins arrive at the team's hotel to surprise them but are chased down and killed. On their bodies they find more counterfeit passports and Nikki determines that they were created using the same paper cutter as the previously found passports and that their creation would require sophisticated equipment that would only be in the possession of a government, not a lone individual.

The hitman uses a counterfeit ID infiltrate the home of and kill the policeman assigned as motorcycle escort for Spivek in order to take his identity. The hitman, now disguised as a motorcycle policeman, places a bomb on the car he is escorting. Trepper, driving the car, senses something is wrong and tells Roadmaster to get the passenger out. Roadmaster and their passenger escape but Trepper's door is stuck shut and he is trapped in the vehicle when it explodes. It is revealed that he was driving a decoy vehicle and Spivek is still alive in another car with Doc, Bud, and Nikki. When they find the burning wreckage Nikki cries and Doc blames himself.

They piece together information pointing them to Sir Cyril Sharpe (Michael Sinelnikoff), curator of the British Museum of World Art, connecting the timing of his movements to the murders, and attempt to identify the person he is meeting with in their photographs. Doc recognizes a scar on the hand of the other man in the photograph and identifies him as Jorge Vialobos (Eddie Velez), also known as "Carlos", a terrorist-for-hire believed to be already dead. Bud remembers him from a Rome airport attack but Doc knows him from the assassination of the Royal Governor in Jamaican in 1980 and the bombing of a Paris drugstore in 1982.

They know that Jorge works with Dieter Porzig, a German bush pilot in Angola who spends his time near the border in Mexico. They draw the hitman out of his hiding place in Mexico by sending a postcard in the same style as the burnt one they previously found, then allow him to notice the members of the C.A.T. Squad following him, causing him to gather the rest of his men together for an escape in a private plane. The C.A.T. Squad follows them and catches his men outside of the plane while Doc enters the plane and shoots Jorge in a final showdown.

At the end of the film Doc files a brief report to the Director and says goodbye to his girlfriend, who is moving to Aspen to reunite with her ex-husband. "Carlos" is then shown stepping off of a bus in Mexico.

Cast
Joseph Cortese as Richard "Doc" Burkholder
Jack Youngblood as John "Roadmaster" Sommers
Steve James as Bud Raines
Bradley Whitford as Leon Trepper
Patricia Charbonneau as Nikki Blake
Barry Corbin as The Director
Eddie Velez as "Carlos"/Jorge Vialobos
Frank Military as Willie Darby
Anna Maria Horsford as Mrs. Raines
Thomas Hauff as Nolan
Vlasta Vrána as Colbert 
Anne E. Curry as Janet
Sam Gray as Dr. Henry Spivek
John Novak as Connery

Production
Filming took place in Mexicali, Baja California and Montréal, Québec.

Critical reception 
Gannett News Service columnist Mike Hughes effusively praised the film's "crisp and intelligent" script. It was "superbly directed" with "carefully composed shots". Despite its lack of star actors, Hughes insisted that "the more you watch C.A.T. Squad, the more you admire it".

References

External links

1986 films
1986 television films
1980s English-language films
1986 action films
American action television films
Films directed by William Friedkin
Films scored by Ennio Morricone
Films set in Mexico
Television pilots not picked up as a series